Mouloudia may refer to:
 Mouloudia Chabab El Eulma or MC El Eulma, Algeria
 Mouloudia Club d'Alger or MC Alger, Algeria
 Mouloudia Club Oranais or MC Oran, Algeria
 Mouloudia Club d'Oujda or MC Oujda, Morocco
 Mouloudia Club de Saïda or MC Saïda, Algeria
 Mouloudia Olympique Béjaïa or MO Béjaïa, Algeria
 Mouloudia Olympique Constantine or MO Constantine, Algeria
 Mouloudia Sportive Populaire de Batna or MSP Batna, Algeria

See also 
 Mawlid (disambiguation)
 Mouloud (disambiguation)